Gomoa East is one of the constituencies represented in the Parliament of Ghana. It elects one Member of Parliament (MP) by the first past the post system of election. Gomoa East is located in the Gomoa district of the Central Region of Ghana.

Boundaries
The seat is located entirely within the Gomoa district of the Central Region of Ghana.

Members of Parliament 

|-
| 2020
|  DESMOND DE-GRAFT PAITOO
| National Democratic Congress
|

Elections

 
 
 
 
 
 
 

 
 
 
 
 
 
 
 
 
 

Richmond Sam Quarm (NPP) won the by-election held on the 8 April 2003 following the death of Emmanuel Acheampong (NPP) in a road traffic accident on February 9, 2003.

See also
List of Ghana Parliament constituencies

References 

Parliamentary constituencies in the Central Region (Ghana)
Central Region (Ghana)